Nazla (also spelled al-Nazlah, Nazle, Annazla or en-Nuzleh) is a Palestinian town in the North Governorate of the Gaza Strip. It was formerly a municipality but was merged with the nearby city of Jabalia. Nazla is located a few kilometers north of Gaza City.

History
Nazla has been identified as the site of the Byzantine-era town of Asalea (Ασαλέα in Greek). Asalea belonged to the city of Gaza during that period. A celebrated Christian figure in Byzantine Gaza was Alaphion of Asalea who was known to be pious and was one of the early missionaries who helped spread Christianity in the area. In the 6th century Madaba Map, Asalea is marked by three towers, a gate and a segment of a wall.

Ottoman era
In 1863, the French explorer Victor Guérin found  the village to have about 150 inhabitants.

An  Ottoman  village list of about 1870 showed that Nazle had 114 houses and a population of 414, though the population count included only men.  

In 1883, the PEF's  Survey of Western Palestine (SWP)   described Nazla as a "small hamlet" and a suburb of Jabalia. To the east of Nazla was a well.

British mandate era
In the 1922 census of Palestine conducted by the British Mandate authorities,  Nazla  had a population of 694, all Muslim, increasing in the 1931 census to 944,  still all Muslims, in 226 houses.

In the 1945 statistics  Nazla had   a population of 1,330, all Muslims,  with 4,510   dunams of land, according to an official land and population survey. Of this, 36 dunams were for citrus and bananas, 547 for plantations and irrigable land, 1,141 used for cereals, while 24  dunams were built-up land.

1948, and after
During Egyptian rule following the 1948 Arab–Israeli War, Nazla was one of six localities to establish a village council to administer its affairs. Israel occupied the Gaza Strip during the 1967 Six-Day War. In the 1970s and 1980s, Israel developed building projects in Nazla, offering Palestinian refugee families subsidized rates to resettle there.

References

Bibliography

External links
Welcome To Nazla
Survey of Western Palestine, Map 19:  IAA,  Wikimedia commons 

North Gaza Governorate
Former municipalities
Neighborhoods in the State of Palestine